NGC 6242 is an open cluster  in the constellation Scorpius.

References

External links

 SEDS – NGC 6242

Open clusters
Scorpius (constellation)
6242